The City to Surf is a popular road running event held annually in Perth, Western Australia in which participants race from the city area to City Beach, a distance of approximately .  A shorter  course is also run in conjunction, and a marathon was held for the first time in the 2009 event. The event is both a "fun run" and a race, attracting both serious runners and community participants who can choose to run or to walk.

40,000 competitors took part in the 2009 event.

History
The Perth event was first held in 1975. It is held annually and organised by the Activ Foundation. Over 25,000 people, participated in the 2005 race over the  course or  wheelchair course stretching from Perth to City Beach, or a shorter  course from Perry Lakes to City Beach.

The course record is 34:37, set in 2013 by James Claxon.

In 2007 a half-marathon was introduced, and in 2009 a full marathon, won by Kenyan Joel Kemboi. The full marathon course starts in the central business district and travels along the Swan River for the first  before entering into Kings Park.  After exiting the park, it is a  journey to City Beach.

The previously certified 12km course was adjusted in 2017, removing  from the total distance, so records set in those years are marked with an asterisk.

12km winners

References

External links
 City to Surf website - Perth

Sport in Perth, Western Australia
Marathons in Australia
Annual sporting events in Australia
1975 establishments in Australia
Recurring sporting events established in 1975